Jaca is a city in northeastern Spain.

Jaca or JACA may also refer to:

Jackfruit
CH Jaca, a Spanish ice hockey team
Jaca Navarra, a horse breed
Journal of American Chiropractic Association

See also 
 Jacka (disambiguation)
 Jaka